Yvette Giraud (16 September 1916 – 3 August 2014) was a French traditional pop singer.

Career
Giraud began singing in 1946 with "Mademoiselle Hortensia", or La Danseuse est Créole. With her husband, former Compagnon de la Chanson Marc Herrand, she wrote an autobiographical book in 2005, published by Editions du Signe in Strasbourg, about how she became internationally famous. Giraud was well known in Japan, where she sang for a long time, responding to the audience expectations since her first visit in 1955. She died in August 2014 at the age of 97.

Awards and accolades
On 14 February 1995 Giraud was awarded the Order of the Precious Wisteria Crown by the Emperor of Japan. She later received the Commandeur des Arts et des Lettres distinction from the French Minister of Culture.

Publications
 Herrand, Marc; Giraud, Yvette (2005). La route enchantée [The Enchanted Road].  Strasbourg: Éditions du Seuil.  .

See also

 List of French singers
 List of members of the Ordre des Arts et des Lettres

References

External links
 
 , French-language cover of Unforgettable

1916 births
2014 deaths
Commandeurs of the Ordre des Arts et des Lettres
French autobiographers
Order of the Precious Crown members
Singers from Paris
Traditional pop music singers
Women autobiographers
20th-century French women writers
21st-century French women writers
French women pop singers
20th-century French women singers
21st-century French women singers